Talat Phlu station is a BTS skytrain station, on the Silom Line in Thon Buri District, Bangkok, Thailand. The station is on Ratchaphruek Road surrounded by residences, small shops and office towers. It is an interchange station with BRT station Ratchaphruek.

Before construction, it was named Ratchaphruek station, but was changed to Talat Phlu station to avoid confusion with the BRT terminus station. The station opened on 14 February 2013 and the walkway to BRT was opened on 5 December 2013.

Although it was named "Talat Phlu" because it is located in the area of Talat Phlu. Indeed, it is located in the area of Dao Khanong near the boundary of Dao Khanong and Bukkhalo Sub-districts, Thon Buri District, diagonally from The Mall Tha Phra.

References

See also 
 Bangkok Skytrain

BTS Skytrain stations
Railway stations opened in 2013
SRT Red Lines